Antonella Faggi (born 20 September 1961) is an Italian politician who served as Mayor of Lecco (2006–2009) and Senator since 2018.

References

1961 births
Living people
Mayors of Lecco
People from Lecco
Lega Nord politicians
Senators of Legislature XVIII of Italy
Women mayors of places in Italy
21st-century Italian women politicians
20th-century Italian women
Women members of the Senate of the Republic (Italy)